William George Ranald Mundell Laurie (4 May 1915 – 19 September 1998) was an English physician, Olympic rowing champion and gold medallist. He was the father of actor Hugh Laurie.

Early life, education and rowing career
Laurie was born in Grantchester, Cambridgeshire, in 1915, the son of William Walker Laurie (1882–1976) and Margaret Grieve (née Mundell) (1886–1959). He was of Scottish descent.

Laurie began his rowing career at Monkton Combe School, and continued rowing when he attended Selwyn College, Cambridge, in 1933, where he was a member of the Hermes Club. A. P. McEldowney, the chronicler of Selwyn rowing and founder of University of London Boat Club, said of Laurie: "This year (1933) there arrived at Selwyn a Freshman who was not only the most famous oarsman Selwyn ever had, but also one of the most famous Great Britain ever had – WGRM Laurie. And we can truly claim him as a Selwyn oarsman. He had always told me he learnt all his rowing from Taffy Jones [W J Llewellyn-Jones] at Monkton Combe School. And where but Selwyn did Taffy learn his rowing?"

Laurie rowed for Cambridge in the 1934, 1935, and 1936 boat races, all of which were won by Cambridge. He was in the boat with Jack Wilson, who was to become his rowing partner later in their careers.  At the 1936 Olympics, he rowed as stroke in Great Britain's eight, the team eventually finishing in fourth place. Together, Laurie and Wilson, rowing for Leander Club, won the Silver Goblets at Henley Royal Regatta in 1938.

After war interrupted their rowing careers, Laurie and Wilson returned to Henley in 1948, once again winning the Silver Goblets.  This was followed a month later by a gold medal in the coxless pair event at the 1948 Olympics in London, rowing on their familiar Henley course. It was described by Laurie as "the best row we ever had". Laurie and Wilson were the best pair of their generation, and it was not until Steve Redgrave and Andy Holmes won the Olympics in 1988 that Britons once more excelled in this class of boat. Laurie and Wilson were known as the "Desert Rats" because of their sojourn in the Sudan. They were trained at Leander Club by Alexander McCulloch, who won a silver medal at the 1908 Olympics. Their boat is now on show at the River and Rowing Museum at Henley-on-Thames, hanging above the boat that won the 1996 Summer Olympics with Redgrave and Pinsent.

Laurie was elected a steward of Henley Royal Regatta in 1951, and also served as a Henley umpire. He sat on Henley's management committee between 1975 and 1986.

Colonial and medical career
Laurie joined the Sudan Political Service in 1936, becoming District Commissioner of Nyala. In 1954, he qualified as a medical doctor, working for 30 years as a general practitioner in Blackbird Leys, Oxford.  He also chaired the Oxford Committee of The Duke of Edinburgh's Award between 1959 and 1969, and the Oxford branch of Save the Children from 1986 to 1989. In 2005, it was proposed that the newly refurbished health centre in Blackbird Leys be named after Laurie in recognition of his service to the local community; however, it was subsequently named The Leys, after the local area, when it opened in February 2006.

Personal life
Laurie was married to Patricia Laidlaw from 1944 until her death from motor neurone disease in 1989; both were members of their local Presbyterian church, now St Columba's United Reformed Church, Oxford.  They had two daughters and two sons, the youngest of whom is the actor Hugh Laurie, who followed in his father's footsteps, rowing for Selwyn College and Cambridge University, and playing a doctor in House. Ran Laurie married Mrs Douglas Ernest Arbuthnot, (Evaline) Mary Arbuthnot, née Morgan in 1990 in Norfolk.

Laurie died of Parkinson's disease in 1998 at the age of 83.

See also
List of Cambridge University Boat Race crews

References

1915 births
1998 deaths
Alumni of Selwyn College, Cambridge
20th-century English medical doctors
British Presbyterians
English male rowers
English Olympic medallists
English people of Scottish descent
Members of Leander Club
People educated at Monkton Combe School
Olympic gold medallists for Great Britain
Olympic rowers of Great Britain
People from Grantchester
Sportspeople from Oxford
Rowers at the 1936 Summer Olympics
Rowers at the 1948 Summer Olympics
Stewards of Henley Royal Regatta
Neurological disease deaths in England
Deaths from Parkinson's disease
Sudan Political Service officers
Olympic medalists in rowing
Medalists at the 1948 Summer Olympics
People from Hethersett